Bob Dylan (born Robert Allen Zimmerman on May 24, 1941) is an American singer–songwriter, author, poet, and painter who has been a major figure in popular music for more than five decades. Many major recording artists have covered Dylan's material, some even increasing a song's popularity as is the case with the Byrds' cover version of "Mr. Tambourine Man" and Jimi Hendrix's version of "All Along the Watchtower".

This article is a list of over 600 musicians who have released their own recordings of songs written by Dylan. It includes more than 1,500 covers of nearly 300 unique songs.

Sortable table of issued recordings

See also
 List of songs written by Bob Dylan

References

External links
Dylan Covers Database[broken?]
It Ain't Me Babe : the Bob Dylan cover lists
Dylan Cover Album Quicklist
 Dylan Covers Database
 Songs of Bob Dylan as performed by others

Cover songs
Dynamic lists of songs
Lists of cover songs
Lists of singers